Univer.  New Dorm is a Russian comedy sitcom was aired on the TNT channel from October 10, 2011 to 2018 october 1 . The show is a spin-off of the popular Russian TV Series Univer.

Plot  
The action takes place after the events of the series Univer. The dorm where the characters lived in the previous series got demolished and three students, Michael, Anton and Kusya move into a new dorm, where they are placed in a unit with three girls, Kristina, Masha, and Yana. The plot revolves around comedic situations and relationships formed among the students.

Main cast
 Stanislav Yarushin as Anton Martynov
 Ararat Keshchyan as Arthur  Mikaelyan
 Vitaly Gogunsky as  Eduard  Kuzmin (season 1)
 Nastasya Samburskaya as Kristina Sokolovskaya (season 1-3)
 Anna Khilkevich as Masha Belova
 Anna Kuzina as Yana Semakina
 Aleksandr Stekolnikov as Valentin Budeyko (season 2-onward)
 Anastasiya Ivanova as	Yulya (season 2)
 Konstantin Shelyagin as Maxim (season 3, recurring season 2)
 Grigory Kokotkin as Aleksey (season 3, recurring season 2)
 Yuliya Frants as Victoria  Beaver (season 3)
 Ekaterina Shumakova  as Veronica  Beaver (season 3)

References

External links 
 Универ. Новая общага

TNT (Russian TV channel) original programming
Russian television sitcoms
2011 Russian television series debuts
2010s Russian television series
Television spin-offs